The 2009 ICC World Cricket League Division Six was a cricket tournament held from 29 August to 5 September 2009 in Singapore. The tournament was the second stage of the qualification structure for the 2015 World Cup as well as part of the wider ICC World Cricket League. The two leading teams of the tournament were promoted to Division Five in 2010.

Teams 

 Bahrain (qualified through 2009 Global Division Seven)
 Botswana (relegated from 2008 Global Division Five)
 Guernsey (qualified through 2009 Global Division Seven)
 Malaysia (qualified through 2008 ACC Trophy Elite)
 Norway (relegated from 2008 Global Division Five)
 Singapore (relegated from 2008 Global Division Five)

Squads

Group stage

Fixtures

Final and Playoffs

References 

International cricket competitions in 2009
2009, 6